The following is a list of music released posthumously.

19th century and earlier
 Frédéric Chopin's opuses 66–74 contain more than twenty posthumous works:
 Fantaisie-Impromptu
 "Beautiful Dreamer", published in 1864, shortly after the death of songwriter Stephen Foster; at the time of publication of its first edition, it was promoted as "the last song ever written by Stephen C. Foster, composed but a few days prior to his death," though it actually may have been written as early as 1862.
 The phonautograms of Édouard-Léon Scott de Martinville were not able to be played back until long after his death in 1879, as they required digital technology

20th century

1900s–1950s

 "Cannibal Carnival", a dance barbarique, was published in late May 1920, three months after composer Sol P. Levy's death on Valentine's Day earlier that year. Levy's composition was later popularized as thematic stock material in such films as Trader Horn and the Tarzan film series.
 Turandot, a three-act opera by Giacomo Puccini, was finished by fellow composer Franco Alfano and premiered, almost two years after Puccini's death, on April 25, 1926.
 Blues legend Robert Johnson's work was released after his death in 1938. Three albums were released King of the Delta Blues Singers (1961), King of the Delta Blues Singers, Vol. II (1970) and The Complete Recordings (1990).
 Fats Navarro's The Complete Blue Note and Capitol Recordings of Fats Navarro and Tadd Dameron released by Blue Note Records in 1995. Also is featured on Dizzy Gillespie's The Complete RCA Victor Recordings (1995).
 Charlie Christian died of tuberculosis in 1942. He did work with Benny Goodman and Lionel Hampton. His album  Solo Flight: The Genius of Charlie Christian  (1972), appears on Dizzy Gillespie's The Complete RCA Victor Recordings (1995), appears in Goodman's  Solo Flight, with the Benny Goodman Sextet  (2003),  Electric, with the Benny Goodman Sextet and the Charlie Christian Quartet  (2003) and others. 
 "Your Cheatin' Heart", "Kaw-Liga", and "Take These Chains from My Heart", three singles released after Hank Williams' death from a heart attack in January 1953, brought on by a fatal combination of alcohol, chloral hydrate, vitamin B12, and morphine.
 Charlie Parker only had two albums released after his death in 1955. The Genius Of Charlie Parker, #1 - night and day (1957) and Dizzy Gillespie's The Complete RCA Victor Recordings (1995).
 Clifford Brown's work was released after his death in 1956. Two albums with Max Roach were Daahoud (1972) and Alone Together: The Best of the Mercury Years (1995).
 Most of Big Bill Broonzy's work was released after he died from throat cancer in 1958. Albums such as Trouble in Mind (2000).
 "Peggy Sue Got Married" and other songs by Buddy Holly were released after his death in February 1959.
 Ritchie Valens, who died along with Holly, his three albums: a self-titled album, Ritchie and In Concert at Pacoima Jr. High were all released after his death as well.
 The Big Bopper, who also died in the accident, wrote Johnny Preston's song Running Bear which was released a few months after his death.
 Last Recordings, released just days after Billie Holiday's death from heart disease and cirrhosis of the liver in July 1959.

1960s

 Jesse Belvin work Mr. Easy featuring Art Pepper and Marty Paich Orchestra (1960), Yesterdays (1975), Hang Your Tears out To Dry (1986) and others were released after he died in a car crash in February 1960.
 "Lonely" and "Weekend", two singles released after Eddie Cochran's death in a taxi accident in April 1960.
 Several of country singer Johnny Horton's albums and singles were released during the rest of the decade.
 Several of Patsy Cline's singles and albums were released after her death in a 1963 plane crash; most importantly the singles "Leavin' on Your Mind", "Sweet Dreams (Of You)", and "Faded Love" became hits, and the albums The Patsy Cline Story, A Portrait of Patsy Cline, That's How a Heartache Begins, and Patsy Cline's Greatest Hits were released.
 Many of Elmore James' singles and albums were released after his death in 1963. Notable singles were released with "Bleeding Heart", "One Way Out" and "Every Day I Have the Blues". Albums Whose Muddy Shoes (1969), Street Talkin (1975), King of the Slide Guitar (1992) and The Classic Early Recordings: 1951–1956 (1993), etc.
 Sam Cooke's albums Shake and Try a Little Love were both released in 1965, a year after he was shot dead.
 Nat King Cole died of lung cancer in February 1965. His album Unreleased was released in 1983, featuring unreleased songs.
 Sonny Boy Williamson II's albums Sonny Boy Williamson and the Yardbirds (1966), The Real Folk Blues (1966) and other albums and singles were released after his death in 1965.
 Bobby Fuller had many albums after his mysterious death in 1966. Some of them include The Bobby Fuller Tapes Vol. 1 (1983) and The Bobby Fuller Tapes Vol. 2 (1984).
 Many of Woody Guthrie's recordings were released in albums after his death in 1967. See Woody Guthrie discography.
 Chilean singer Violeta Parra had several albums released after her suicide in 1967, including Violeta Parra y sus canciones reencontradas en París and Canciones de Violeta Parra (both in 1971).
 The single "(Sittin' On) The Dock of the Bay" was released a month after the plane crash that killed singer Otis Redding.
 Edith Piaf's last recording "L'homme de Berlin" was released five years after she died of liver cancer.
 "I'm Sorry" and "Seabreeze" by Frankie Lymon were released in 1969, a year after Lymon's untimely death from an accidental heroin overdose.
 Little Willie John's album Ninety Sixty Six was released in 2008, 40 years after he died of a heart attack in jail.
 With the sudden passing of Wes Montgomery, albums Road Song (1968), Willow Weep for Me (1969) and Eulogy (1970) were released.
 The Sheik of Shake by Dickie Pride was released in 1992, 23 years after he died from an accidental overdose.
 Fairport Convention's Martin Lamble was killed in a car accident just nearly two months before their album Unhalfbricking was released. 
 Brian Jones of The Rolling Stones drowned in a swimming pool in July 1969. The band's album Let It Bleed was released five months later.

1970s

 Several of Otis Spann`s work was released after his death. Last Call: Live at Boston Tea Party was released in 2000 as it was recorded shortly before his passing.
 Earl Hooker appears on Sonny Terry's and Brownie McGhee's I Couldn't Believe My Eyes (1973) which was recorded in 1969 a year before he died. 
 The last album of Alan Wilson with Canned Heat was Hooker 'n Heat in collaboration with John Lee Hooker was released in 1971. He is also featured on Live at Topanga Corral (1971), Woodstock 2 (1971), and Uncanned! The Best of Canned Heat (1994).
 His solo album Alan Wilson: The Blind Owl was released in 2013, 43 years later.
 Most of the extensive catalog of American guitarist Jimi Hendrix; in his lifetime, Hendrix only saw the release of three albums by the Jimi Hendrix Experience, a compilation by the same group, and a live album by the Band of Gypsys. The Cry of Love (1971), Valleys of Neptune (2010), West Coast Seattle Boy: The Jimi Hendrix Anthology (2010), People, Hell and Angels (2013), Both Sides of the Sky (2018).
 Janis Joplin's Pearl was released in February 1971, four months after her death. Joplin had recorded all the vocals for all the songs (except "Buried Alive In The Blues") before she died. Her band, the Full Tilt Boogie Band, recorded the music.
 Her rarity album Rare Pearls was released in 1999, the 9-disc set Blow All My Blues Away (2012) and The Pearl Sessions (2012).  
 She also appeared on The Lost Tapes with Big Brother and the Holding Company released in 2008. 
 Baby Huey's only album The Baby Huey Story: The Living Legend was released in February 1971, four months after his death from a drug overdose.
 Arlester "Dyke" Christian of Dyke and the Blazers had three compilations released after his death in 1971. So Sharp (1983), The Funky Broadway (1999), and We Got More Soul (2007).
 Jim Morrison's poetry album An American Prayer was released in 1978, seven years after his death. 
The Doors' The Doors: Box Set was released in 1997, 26 years after Morrison's death. This box set featured many unreleased tracks and live songs.
 Duane Allman had many albums released after his death in 1971 in a motorcycle accident such as An Anthology, An Anthology Volume II (1974), and Eat a Peach with The Allman Brothers Band.
 Berry Oakley also with the Allman Brothers Band died in a motorcycle crash near where Duane Allman was killed a year earlier. He is featured in Brothers and Sisters in 1973.
 Lee Morgan is featured on Charles Earland's Intensity (1972), Charles III (1973), and Funk Fantastique (2004). All of this was recorded just days before Morgan was shot to death.
 Linda Jones' Soul Talkin was released in 2008. She died in 1972 from diabetes.
 Leslie Harvey is featured on Stone the Crows' live albums The BBC Sessions Vol 1. and 2. (1998), Live Montreux 1972 (2002), Radio Sessions 1969-1972 (2009), and BBC Sessions 1969-1972 (2014). All the band's albums were recorded between 1969 and 1972. He died in 1972 when he was electrocuted.
 The only album that New York Dolls`s Billy Murcia played on is Lipstick Killers – The Mercer Street Sessions 1972 (1981). Murcia died in November 1972.
 Danny Whitten who was the guitarist for Neil Young and Crazy Horse appears on Young's Tonight's the Night (1975), Gone Dead Train: The Best of Crazy Horse 1971–1989 (2005), Scratchy: The Complete Reprise Recordings (2005), and Live at the Fillmore East (2006). Also appeared on Young's The Archives Vol. 1 1963–1972. 
 Ron "Pigpen" McKernan founding member of the Grateful Dead is featured in many albums since his death in 1973. He died from gastrointestinal bleeding from years of alcoholism.
 Clarence White was killed in 1973 after being hit by a drunk driver. He is featured on Kentucky Colonels, his solo albums and The Byrds' Live at the Fillmore – February 1969 (2000), Live at Royal Albert Hall 1971 (2008) and The Lost Broadcasts (2011).
 Gram Parsons had several albums released after his death from a drug overdose in 1973; including Grievous Angel (1974) and Sleepless Nights (1976). Also, he is featured on many albums with The Flying Burrito Brothers and The Byrds.
 Several of Jim Croce's singles and albums were released after his 1973 death in a plane crash along with Maury Muehleisen. Together their work was released posthumously.
 Maury Muehleisen's album Before the Ever Since: Early Recordings 1969-1970 (2006) and a reissue of 1970's Gingerbreadd (2006) edition was released after he died in a plane crash in 1973 along with Jim Croce.
 Bobby Darin's Live at the Desert Inn (1987) was recorded in 1971. Darin died following heart surgery in 1973.
 Duke Ellington's Eastbourne Performance was released in 1975, a year after his death.
 Graham Bond's Live at Klooks Kleek was released in 1988, 14 years after his death. The album was recorded in 1964 with the Graham Bond Organisation.
 Mama Cass of The Mamas & the Papas is featured on The Mamas & the Papas Complete Anthology (1999) with previously unreleased tracks. Cass died in 1974.
 Various home recordings by Nick Drake have been released since his death in 1974 to satisfy growing interest in his work.
 Various solo albums by Pete Ham,  7 Park Avenue (1997), Golders Green (1999) and The Keywhole Street Demos 1966-67 (2013) were released several after his death in 1975.
 Various live recordings and studio outtakes by Tim Buckley have been released posthumously 1975 from an accidental overdose of heroin and alcohol.
 Al Jackson Jr. drummer for Booker T. & the M.G.'s was murdered in 1975. He appears on the bands albums' The Very Best of Booker T. & the MG's (1994), Play The 'Hip Hits''' (1995), Time Is Tight (1998) and Stax Instrumentals (2002) all have unreleased tracks.  
 Blues legend Howlin' Wolf had various albums released after his death in 1976. Featuring His Best (1997).
 Many of Vince Guaraldi's work was released after his in death in 1976 due to a sudden heart attack. Featuring Jazz Casual: Paul Winter / Bola Sete & Vince Guaraldi (2001), A Charlie Brown Christmas (2006 & 2012) editions, The Definitive Vince Guaraldi (2009), and Vince Guaraldi and the Lost Cues from the Charlie Brown Television Specials Vol 1. (2006) and Vol 2. (2010).
 Florence Ballard only album The Supreme Florence "Flo" Ballard (2002). Originally the album was supposed to be released by ABC Records in 1968 under the proposed title, "...You Don't Have To".
 Paul Kossoff's 2nd Street (1976) and Koss (1977) were released after he died from a pulmonary embolism whilst on a flight from Los Angeles to New York in 1976.
 The Yardbirds' Keith Relf is featured many live Yardbirds albums like BBC Sessions and Live! Blueswailing July '64. Also his singles "Together Now" and "All the Fallen Angels" were both released in 1989. "All the Fallen Angels" was recorded in 1976 just 12 days before his death.
 Jimmy Reed died in 1976 of respiratory failure. Two albums wre released after his death: I'm Going to Upside Your Head (1980) and I'm the Man Down There (1985).
 Many of Peter Laughner's work was released after his death in 1977. Albums Peter Laughner (1982), Take The Guitar Player for a Ride (1994), and The Day the Earth Met the Rocket from the Tombs (2002) by Rocket from the Tombs. Also appears in Pere Ubu's The Shape of Things (2000).
 Several of Elvis Presley albums have been released since his death in 1977. In October 1977 Elvis in Concert was released two months after his death.
 Several albums were released after Marc Bolan`s death in 1977. Featuring his solo albums, work he did with John's Children and concert albums he did with T.Rex. Featuring You Scare Me to Death which was released in 1981.
 Bing Crosby's Seasons was released after he died. Singles "Peace on Earth/Little Drummer Boy" with David Bowie was released in 1982 and "True Love" with Grace Kelly was released in 1983. Many other albums have been released since 1977.
 The only solo album recorded by Steve Gaines of Lynyrd Skynyrd, One in the Sun, was released in 1988, eleven years after he died in a plane crash.
 Ronnie Van Zandt of Lynyrd Skynyrd was featured on Skynyrd's First and... Last (1978) recorded during their early years. He died in 1977, in the same plane crash as Steve Gaines.
 Many of Rahsaan Roland Kirk's work was released after his death in 1977. Featuring I, Eye, Aye: Live at the Montreux Jazz Festival, 1972 (1996), Dog Years in the Fourth Ring (1997), and Brotherman in the Fatherland (2006).
 Chicago's Terry Kath is featured on Chicago Presents The Innovative Guitar of Terry Kath (1997) and Chicago XXXIV: Live in '75 (2011). He accidentally shot himself in 1978.
 Sandy Denny has released many albums since her death. Includes Who Knows Where the Time Goes? (1985), The BBC Sessions 1971–1973 (1997), Gold Dust (1998), and Sandy Denny (2011).
 Keith Moon of The Who is featured in many live albums that were released after his death in 1978 of a drug overdose. 
 Chris Bell's debut album I Am the Cosmos was released in 1992, fourteen years after he was killed in a car accident.
 Sex Pistols bassist Sid Vicious has been the subject of a plethora of posthumous solo albums in the years following his death of a heroin overdose in 1979.
 Lowell George appears on Little Feat's Down on the Farm released after the band broke up that same year and Hoy-Hoy! (1981) and other Little Feat albums. He did an album with Bonnie Raitt Ultrasonic Studios 1972 (Live) (2014). He also appears on Frank Zappa's You Can't Do That on Stage Anymore Vol 1. (1988), Vol.4 (1991), Vol 5. (1992), Mystery Disc (1998) and other Zappa albums.
 Jimmy McCulloch of Paul McCartney and Wings is featured on Thunderclap Newman's Beyond Hollywood (2010).
 John Glascock is featured in many of Jethro Tull's albums like 20 Years of Jethro Tull (1988) and The Best of Jethro Tull – The Anniversary Collection (1993). He is also featured in other bands Carmen's and Toe Fat's albums.

1980s

 Two songs performed by Donny Hathaway (in collaboration with Roberta Flack) - "Back Together Again" and "You Are My Heaven" - were released in 1980, one year following his death.
 Two singles and Love Lives Forever were released in 1980 after Minnie Riperton died a year earlier.
 Bon Scott, the lead singer of AC/DC, died of alcohol poisoning in 1980. The band's 1997 boxset Bonfire includes unreleased recordings of Scott.
 The non-album single "Love Will Tear Us Apart" and its companion album Closer, in June and August 1980, respectively, after the suicide of Joy Division lead singer Ian Curtis on May 18 of that year. The remaining members of Joy Division later went on to form New Order.
 Ricky Lancelotti appears on Frank Zappa's The Lost Episodes and Läther both released in 1996. He died in 1980.
 Punk musician Darby Crash is featured on the Germs' What We Do Is Secret and Germicide both released in 1981. Crash committed suicide in 1980.
 John Lennon was murdered on December 8, 1980. His singles "Woman" and "Watching the Wheels" were both released in 1981. The album Milk and Honey came out in 1984. He also appears in many of The Beatles' albums released since his death.   
 Tim Hardin's albums Unforgiven and The Homecoming Concert were both less than a year after his death. Other songs were released on other albums compilations album years later.
 Mike Bloomfield's albums Living in the Fast Lane (1981), Bloomfield: A Retrospective (1983) and I'm with You Always (2008) were released after his death.
 Coda (1982) by Led Zeppelin was released two years after the death of John Bonham. Bonham is featured in many live albums of the band. 
 Soldier on the Wall by punk legend Alex Harvey was released months after his death in 1982.
 Confrontation (1983) by Bob Marley and the Wailers was released two years after Marley's death from metastatic melanoma.
 Four albums by The Carpenters have been released since the death of Karen Carpenter:  Voice of the Heart, An Old-Fashioned Christmas, Lovelines and As Time Goes By. Her aborted solo album has also been released, simply titled Karen Carpenter.
 The Pretenders' Pete Farndon and James Honeyman-Scott were both featured on the 2006 remaster editions of Pretenders and Pretenders II with previously unreleased material and demos. Honeyman-Scott died in 1982 and Fandon in 1983, both of drug overdoses.
 Thelonious Monk's albums Thelonious Monk: The Complete Riverside Recordings (1986), Thelonious Monk Nonet Live in Paris 1967 (1988), Thelonious Monk Quartet with John Coltrane at Carnegie Hall (2005), The Complete 1957 Riverside Recordings (2006), and many others since his death in 1982. 
 Muddy Waters' albums Rollin' Stone: The Golden Anniversary Collection (2000), The Anthology: 1947–1972 (2001), Breakin' It Up, Breakin' It Down (2007) and Live at the Checkerboard Lounge, Chicago 1981 (2012), etc.
 Chris Wood's only album Vulcan was released in 2008. It was recorded in 1983, the same year he died.
 Klaus Nomi's albums Encore (1983), In Concert (1986) and Za Bakdaz (2007) were released after he died from AIDS in 1983. 
 Stukas Over Disneyland by The Dickies was released in 1983 two years after Chuck Wagon's death.
 The album Dancin' wid da Blues Brothers by The Blues Brothers was released a year after John Belushi's death in 1982.
 Stan Rogers died in a burning airplane in June 1983. His album For the Family was released a few weeks after his death. 
 Dennis Wilson of The Beach Boys drowned in the ocean in 1983. He appears on some unreleased demos that were released years after his death.
 The Marvin Gaye albums Dream of a Lifetime (1985, Columbia), Romantically Yours (1985, Columbia) (the single "Sanctified Lady" became a modest international hit when it was released in 1985 reaching number two on the American R&B charts and number fifty-seven in the UK.) and Vulnerable (1997, Motown) (which was the aborted The Ballads album) were released after he was killed by his father in 1984.
 Andy Kaufman's Andy and His Grandmother released on July 13, 2013, a comedy album that was recorded from 1977 to 1979. Kaufman died in 1984 from lung cancer and kidney failure. 
 Jimmie Spheeris was killed in a motorcycle crash on July 4, 1984, hours after he had recorded his album Spheeris. The album was released in 2000.
 My Place, a solo album by Australian guitarist Guy McDonough (Australian Crawl), was released in 1985 after his death.
 Ricky Wilson appears on The B-52's Bouncing Off the Satellites released in 1986 a year after his death. Also he is featured on Nude on the Moon: The B-52's Anthology (2002), and Live! 8-24-1979 (2015).
 The live album Ballot Result by the punk band The Minutemen was released two years after the death of lead singer/guitarist D. Boon in a van accident.
 Gary Thain and David Byron of Uriah Heep are both featured on Live at Shepperton '74 (1986). Both Thain died in 1975 and Byron died in 1985.
 Also David Byron is also featured on The Lansdowne Tapes (1993) early recordings of Uriah Heep, Lost and Found (2003) by the David Byron Band and his solo album That Was Only Yesterday – The Last EP (2008).
 Randy Rhoads is featured in Ozzy Osbourne's album Tribute which was a tribute album to Rhoads who died in 1982 was released five years after. The album was work done by Rhoads. Also Quiet Riot released the album The Randy Rhoads Years in 1993 during Rhoads time with the band in the late 1970s.
 Many of Phil Lynott's work has been released. With albums Live in Sweden 1983 (2001), The Lost Recording 1970 (2006) and Yellow Pearl (2010).
 Richard Manuel's solo work Whispering Pines: Live at the Getaway (2002), Live at O'Tooles Tavern (2009) and Live at the Lone Star (2011). He is also featured the many of The Band's albums. He did two last songs with the band, "Country Boy," on Jericho (1993), and "She Knows," on High on the Hog (1996).
 The song "To Live Is to Die" on heavy metal band Metallica's fourth studio album ...And Justice for All (1988) was written by bassist Cliff Burton, who died in 1986, when the band's tour bus crashed in Sweden.
 Six years after Harry Chapin's death the album Remember When the Music was released in 1987, The Last Protest Singer in 1988 and many others.
 Paul Butterfield died of an accidental drug overdose on May 4, 1987. Several live albums were released years after his death. 
 Hip hop disc jockey and producer Scott La Rock was murdered in 1987. His singles and EPs with KRS-One have been released. 
 Peter Tosh was murdered in 1987. He had several live albums and compilations released after his death. 
 Bola Sete's albums Ocean Memories (1999), and The Navy Swings (2010) with Vince Guaraldi. Sete died in 1987. Ocean Memories was recorded in 1972 with unreleased song during the recording of Ocean. The Navy Swings with Vince Guaraldi were recorded radio shows for the U.S. Navy in 1965.    
 Many of Jaco Pastorius' work with various artists and Weather Report have been released since his death in 1987. His album The Birthday Concert (1995) was recorded live in 1981.
 All of Alexander Bashlachev's work was released after he committed suicide in 1988. His first album, Time of Bells was released in 1989.
 Divine died in 1988, followed by the release of The Best Of and the Rest Of (1989) (compilation), 12 Inch Collection (1993) (compilation), Born To Be Cheap (1995) (live), Shoot Your Shot (1995), The Originals and the Remixes (1996) (2-CD compilation), and The Best of Divine (1997) (compilation).
 Red Hot Chili Peppers guitarist Hillel Slovak died in 1988 of a drug overdose. He appears in Mother's Milk with the song "Fire".
 Many of Roy Buchanan's albums Early Years (1989, Krazy Kat), Sweet Dreams: The Anthology (1992, Polydor) and many others were released after Buchanan committed suicide in a prison in 1988.
 Mystery Girl by Roy Orbison; it spawned a hit single in "You Got It".
 Echo & the Bunnymen's drummer Pete de Freitas died in a motorcycle accident in 1989. He appears on BBC Radio 1 Live in Concert (1992), and Crystal Days: 1979–1999 (2001).
 B. W. Stevenson's Rainbow Down The Road (1990, Amazing Records) was released two years after Stevenson died during heart surgery.  
 I Wonder Do You Think of Me (1989), Kentucky Bluebird (1991), Keith Whitley: A Tribute Album (1994), and Wherever You Are Tonight (1995) were all released following Keith Whitley's death from an alcohol overdose in 1989.

1990s
 Apple, the sole album by grunge band Mother Love Bone, was released days after lead singer Andrew Wood's death in 1990.
 Grateful Dead's keyboardist Brent Mydland was featured in many of the Dead's albums after his death in 1990. He was featured on Without a Net (1990), Infrared Roses (1991), and many other live albums.
 Soviet-Korean singer Viktor Tsoi who was the co-founder of the band Kino, was featured in the band's final album Kino after his death in 1990.
 Brazilian singer Cazuza's album Por aí was released in 1991. He died of AIDS in 1990.
 Tom Fogerty's Sidekicks (1992) with Randy Oda, Merl Saunders' Fire Up Plus (1992), The Very Best of Tom Fogerty (1999) and Creedence Clearwater Revival albums were released after he died in 1990 from tuberculosis.
 Steve Marriott's work was released. Also albums he did with Small Faces and Humble Pie. 
 Stevie Ray Vaughan's albums Family Style (1990), The Sky Is Crying (1991), and In the Beginning (1992) were released after his death in a plane crash in 1990.
 Rock On! was released seven months after Del Shannon's suicide.
 Steve Clark wrote songs and did demos for Def Leppard's 1992 album Adrenalize, which was released a year after his death.
 The last studio album by Miles Davis, Doo-Bop (1992), was released nine months after his death. Many live albums have been released since his death.
Kiss' Eric Carr appears on backing vocals on "God Gave Rock 'N' Roll to You II", and drums on "Carr Jam 1981" on Revenge (1992). Carr died of heart cancer in 1991.
 Freddie Mercury solo albums The Freddie Mercury Album and The Great Pretender were both released in 1992 a year after his death from AIDS. Mercury also had other albums released later on.    
 Paul Hackman of Helix is featured on Half-Alive (1998), Deep Cuts: The Best Of (1999), B-Sides (1999), and Live! in Buffalo (2001). Hackman died in a car accident in 1992.
 Toto released Kingdom of Desire (1992) just weeks after Jeff Porcaro died. The album is a tribute to him. He also played in Bruce Springsteen's song Sad Eyes and Trouble River both released in 1999. 
7 Year Bitch released their first album Sick 'Em after co-founder and guitarist Stefanie Sargent died of a drug overdose.
 Since Albert King's death many albums have been released, including with Blues at Sunset (1993) and In Session (1999) with Stevie Ray Vaughan.
 Conway Twitty's album Final Touches (1993) was released two months after his death from an aneurysm.
 Just Like This (1999), Showtime (1999), Indian Summer (2001) by Mick Ronson were released after his death in 1993. He is also featured on albums by David Bowie, Bob Dylan, Ian Hunter and Elton John.
 De Mysteriis Dom Sathanas by Mayhem was released in May 1994, posthumously after the murder of guitarist Euronymous in August 1991, and after the suicide of vocalist Dead in April 1991.
 GG Allin's Brutality and Bloodshed for All was released three months after he died in 1993 after a drug overdose. The EP Layin' Up with Linda, comprising his final recordings, followed a few months later.
 The Gits' album Enter: The Conquering Chicken (1994) was released one year after lead singer Mia Zapata was murdered.
 Rob "The Bass Thing" Jones of The Wonder Stuff appeared on Construction for the Modern Idiot released a month after he died of a sudden heart attack. The album reached No. 4 in the UK.
 Frank Zappa died of prostate cancer in December 1993. His solo work and his work with The Mothers Of Invention was released after his death with albums like Civilization Phaze III (1994), The MOFO Project/Object (2006) and many others.
 [[Keep the Fire Burnin' (Dan Hartman album)|Keep the Fire Burnin]] (1994) by Dan Hartman was released nine months after his death.
 MTV Unplugged in New York, on November 1, 1994, after singer/songwriter/guitarist Kurt Cobain's death on April 5 of the same year; also From the Muddy Banks of the Wishkah, With the Lights Out and Sliver: The Best of the Box. There was also a single, "You Know You're Right", recorded on January 30, 1994, at Bob Lang Studios during Nirvana's final studio session; it was finally released on the band's compilation album, Nirvana, eight years after Cobain's death.
 Hole's Kristen Pfaff was featured on one track of My Body, the Hand Grenade three years after her death.
 A Future to This Life: Robocop – The Series Soundtrack by Joe Walsh and various artists features Nicky Hopkins who died a few months before its release.
 Vivian Stanshall who died in 1995. His singles  "Blind Date", "11 Moustachioed Daughters" b/w "The Strain", and "Cyborg Signal" were released in 2016. 
 The self-titled album of Sun Red Sun was released in 1995 nearly two years after lead singer Ray Gillen died.
 Dreaming of You (1995), the only English album by Selena, was released four months after her murder by Yolanda Saldívar.
 Rory Gallagher albums Meeting with the G-Man (2003), Live at Montreux (2006), and Notes from San Francisco (2011) were all released after he died of an infection in 1995.
 Dwayne Goettel of Skinny Puppy appeared in many of their albums like The Process (1996) and Puppy Gristle (2002). Goettel died of a drug overdose in 1995.
 Velvet Underground's Sterling Morrison is on Peel Slowly and See a month after he died, Bootleg Series Volume 1: The Quine Tapes (2001), and The Complete Matrix Tapes (2015). Also he appeared on bandmate's John Cale's Antártida (1995) and Stainless Gamelan (2002).
 Harry Nilsson's album Losst and Founnd was released 25 years after his death from heart attack in 1994.
 Queen album Made in Heaven was released four years after the death of frontman Freddie Mercury from AIDS-related bronchopneumonia in 1991. 
 Eazy-E's album Str8 off tha Streetz of Muthaphukkin Compton (1995) was released eight months after his death from AIDS.
 Many of Jerry Garcia's albums were released with The Grateful Dead and Jerry Garcia Band's How Sweet It Is (1997) and many others.
 Antonio Brasileiro and Tom Jobim were both released after Antonio Carlos Jobim's death from cardiac arrest on December 8, 1994.
 The Beatles' songs "Free as a Bird" and "Real Love" were released in 1995, fifteen years after John Lennon was murdered. Both songs featured the three surviving Beatles playing instruments over Lennon's demos.
 Also The Beatles fifth member Stuart Sutcliffe is on Anthology 1 released in 1995. The songs were recorded in 1960 and Sutcliffe passed away in 1962 before the Beatles became famous with the Fab Four.
 Chic's Bernard Edwards appeared on the band's Live at the Budokan (1999) and The Power Station's Living in Fear just seven months after died of pneumonia.
 Nico (1996) by Blind Melon, released one year after Shannon Hoon's death from a cocaine overdose, The Best of Blind Melon (2005) featuring three live tracks and Live at the Palace (2006).
 The self-titled album from California ska group Sublime was released after singer/songwriter/guitarist Bradley Nowell's 1996 heroin overdose death. 3 Ring Circus - Live at The Palace was recorded in 1995 and released in 2013.
 Kevin Gilbert's concept album, The Shaming of the True, released in 2000, four years after his death from autoerotic asphyxiation.
 John Kahn did an album with Jerry Garcia Pure Jerry: Marin Veterans Memorial Auditorium, San Rafael, California, February 28, 1986 (2009). Kahn died in 1996 from a heart attack. 
 British drummer Mathew Fletcher was featured on Heavenly's Operation Heavenly a few months after he committed suicide in 1996. He is also featured on Talulah Gosh's single "Demos EP" (2011) and the album Was It Just a Dream? (2013).
 Jason Thirsk appears in Humble Gods' album No Heroes (1996) a few months after his 1996 accidental suicide while he was drunk. He also appears on Pennywise's Full Circle (1997), and Yesterdays (2014).
 The Don Killuminati: The 7 Day Theory (1996), R U Still Down? (Remember Me) (1997), Still I Rise (1999), Until the End of Time (2001), Better Dayz (2002), Tupac: Resurrection (2003), Loyal to the Game (2004), and Pac's Life (2006) were all released after Tupac Shakur's murder on September 13, 1996.
 Colleen Peterson's Postcards from California was released in 2004 eight years after she died of cancer.
 Eva by Heart (1997), Time After Time (2000), Imagine (2002), American Tune (2003), Somewhere (2008), and Simply Eva (2011), all after Eva Cassidy's death from melanoma in 1996.
 Townes Van Zandt's work A Far Cry From Dead (1999), Texas Rain: The Texas Hill Country Recordings (2001), In the Beginning (2003), Sunshine Boy: The Unheard Studio Sessions & Demos 1971–1972 (2013), and Sky Blue (2019). All released after he died suddenly in 1997. 
 Billy MacKenzie of The Associates appears on The Glamour Chase (2002). Many solo albums like Beyond The Sun (1997), Eurocentric (2001) and Transmission Impossible (2005) were all released. He died by suicide in 1997.  
 Mystery White Boy and Sketches for My Sweetheart the Drunk was released after the death of Jeff Buckley in 1997.
 The Notorious B.I.G.'s albums Life After Death, Born Again and Duets: The Final Chapter were released after his murder in 1997.
 Johnny Copeland's albums "The Crazy Cajun Recordings" (1998) and Honky Tonkin (1999) both released after he died from complications of heart surgery.
Much of Pakistani musician Nusrat Fateh Ali Khan's work was released after his death in 1997. His remix album Star Rise was released a year later.
Luther Allison's Live in Chicago (1999), Standing at the Crossroad (1999), Pay It Forward (2002), Underground (2007), and Songs from the Road (2009). He died in 1997. 
 Nigeria's Fela Kuti work was released after he died from AIDS in 1997. Albums The Underground Spiritual Game (2004), Live in Detroit, 1986 (2012) and many others were released.
 Michael Hutchence, a self-titled album by the original frontman of INXS, was released after his 1997 death of suicide by hanging.
Austrian pop star Falco had three albums released after his death in 1998: Out of the Dark (Into the Light) (1998), Verdammt wir leben noch (1999), and The Spirit Never Dies (2009).
 Rozz Williams with Christian Death and Shadow Project's albums. His first live album Live in Berlin was released in 2000.
 Drummer Cozy Powell's album Especially For You was released in 1999, a year after his death.
 John Denver's Forever, John was released in September 1998 a year after he died and Christmas in Concert in 2001. Many live albums have been released.
 Linda McCartney's only album Wide Prairie was released in October 1998, after she died of cancer on April 17, 1998.
 Junior Wells albums Every Day I Have the Blues with Buddy Guy (2000), Live at Theresa's 1975 (2006) and many others were released 
 zilch's debut album, 3.2.1., was released 2 months after vocalist hide's death on May 2, 1998. A remix album, Bastard Eyes, was released the following year.
 Ja, Zoo by Japanese musician hide was released 6 months after his death.
 California session singer Warren Wiebe has been featured on various compilation albums following his suicide in October 1998 as well as several demo recordings.
 Björn Afzelius albums Elsinore (1999), Björn Afzelius & Mikael Wiehe 1993 – Malmöinspelningarna (with Mikael Wiehe) (2004), and Tusen bitar – Sånger om kärlek & rättvisa (2011).
 LB IV Life was the last album to have Freaky Tah. It was released six months after his death.
 Founder of Moby Grape Skip Spence single "Land of the Sun" was released the year he died. Also, he is featured on two albums by Moby Grape The Place and the Time (2009) and Moby Grape Live (2010).
 Rapper Big L's album The Big Picture was released in 2000, a year after he was shot to death in his own neighbourhood; the murder is still unsolved.
 Stéphane Sirkis, member of French band Indochine, died of Hepatitis C while Dancetaria was still in production. The album was released nearly six months after his passing.
 Tripping Daisy member Wes Berggren is on the band's last self titled album was released in 2000 just months after Berggren died of an overdose.
 Rick Danko is featured on many of The Band's live albums since his death in 1999.  His solo albums Times Like These (2000), Cryin' Heart Blues (2005) and many others. He is also featured on Richard Manuel's albums and Danko/Fjeld/Andersen's One More Shot (2002) with Jonas Fjeld and Eric Andersen.

21st century
2000s
 Raymond Scott's album Manhattan Research Inc. (2000), which contained selected samples of Scott's work from the 1950s and 1960s for film soundtracks, commercials, and for his own technical and musical experiments, was released six years after Scott's death in 1994.
 Israeli musician Ofra Haza's albums Manginat Halev Vol 1. and 2. (2000 and 2004) and remix album Forever (2008) were released after her death in 2000 from AIDS related pneumonia.
 Big Pun's Yeeeah Baby was released two months after he died of a heart attack. The album hit #3 in the Billboard 200 and  #1 in the Top R&B/Hip Hop Albums at the end of the year. Endangered Species was released in 2001 and featured the single "How We Roll" featuring Ashanti.
 The Whitlams released two singles after the death of bassist Andy Lewis in early 2000: "Blow Up the Pokies" (2000) and "Made Me Hard" (2001).
 Freddie Mercury's The Solo Collection was released in 2000, nine years after his death from AIDS. 
 Ian Dury's Ten More Turnips from the Tip was released in 2002, two years after his death.
 The Essential Collection and The Complete Duets with Marvin Gaye by Tammi Terrell were both released in 2001. Gaye was murdered in 1984 and Terrell of cancer in 1970.
 Aaliyah's music video for her song "Rock the Boat" was completed the morning of her death. Her album I Care 4 U was released posthumously, with six previously unreleased tracks.
 Don't Worry About Me, the first solo album by Joey Ramone, was released a year after Joey's death in 2001. A year later Dee Dee Ramone died. Both were featured on NYC 1978 (2003).
 Creedence Clearwater Revival released their box set Creedence Clearwater Revival: Box Set (2001) after Tom Fogerty died in 1990. The box set features tracks when CCR was known as The Blue Velvets and The Golliwogs.
 George Harrison was featured in the song "Horse to the Water" on the album Small World, Big Band by Jools Holland's Rhythm and Blues Orchestra. He died from lung cancer in 2001.
 Harrison's album Brainwashed was completed by his son Dhani Harrison and producer Jeff Lynne. The album was released in November 2002, one year after his death.
 Harrison appears on many unreleased recordings by The Beatles.
 3D (2002), TLC's studio album, was released just seven months after Lisa Lopes' death from a car accident. Lopes' own second studio album, Eye Legacy was released in January 2009, almost seven years after her death.
Snot's live album Alive! was released in 2002 after lead singer Lynn Strait's death in 1998.
David Ruffin's album David (not to be confused with his self-titled 1973 album) was released in 2004, thirteen years after his death in 1991.
 Paul Baloff wrote songs for the album Let There Be Blood (2008) by Exodus.
 Sinema (2002), a video album by Drowning Pool, was released three months after Dave Williams suddenly died of heart failure.
 Home and Away was released sixteen years after Del Shannon's suicide in 1990.
 Live at Montreux 2001 by Run-DMC featuring Jam Master Jay was released in 2007, four and a half years after Jay was murdered.
 Rick James' last studio album Deeper Still was released in 2007, three years after his death. He also appears on Neil Young's The Archives Vol. 1 1963–1972 (2009) when he was a member of The Mynah Birds.   
 Streetcore, the third and final album by Joe Strummer & The Mescaleros, was released in October 2003, ten months after Strummer's death.
 Jeremy Michael Ward was featured on Omar Rodríguez-López albums A Manual Dexterity: Soundtrack Volume One (2004), Omar Rodriguez Lopez & Jeremy Michael Ward (2008) and Minor Cuts and Scrapes in the Bushes Ahead (2008) were all recorded in 2001. Ward died in May 2003.
 From a Basement on the Hill (2004) and New Moon (2007) were released after Elliott Smith's death in October 2003.
 22nd Century Lifestyle (2004) by pre)Thing was released after former member of Crazy Town and lead singer of pre)Thing Rust Epique died of a sudden heart attack a month before its release.
 Cuban singer Celia Cruz's Regalo del Alma (2003) and Dios Disfrute a la Reina (2004) were released after her death in 2003. Dios Disfrute a la Reina was recorded between 1998 and 1999.
 Warren Zevon's Reconsider Me: The Love Songs (2006) and Preludes: Rare and Unreleased Recordings (2007) were released after his death in 2003. Preludes was recorded before 1976.
 Buzz Gardner appears on Frank Zappa's Beat the Boots! III (2009) and Ant-Bee's Electronic Church Muzik (2011). 
 The Ape of Naples (2005) and The New Backwards (2008) were released after member of Coil John Balance died in 2004.
 Ray Charles' album Genius Loves Company (2004) was released two months after his death. Also albums Genius & Friends (2005), Ray Sings, Basie Swings (2006), and Rare Genius (2010) were released was well.
 Jan & Dean's Carnival of Sound was released in 2010 after Jan Berry died in 2004. It was the duo's last album and was recorded between 1966 and 1968.
 Robert Palmer's Live at the BBC was released in 2010, seven years after his death.
 Terje Bakken's Valfar, ein Windir was released in November 2004 just nearly a year after he died.
 Rebel Meets Rebel, a collaboration album by David Allan Coe and Pantera, was released in May 2005, five months after Pantera guitarist Dimebag Darrell was murdered.
 A Son Unique by Ol' Dirty Bastard was released seven months after his death in 2004. Also, many albums have been released since and his work with Wu-Tang Clan.
 Drummer Kenny Buttrey appears on Neil Young's The Archives Vol. 1 1963–1972 (2009), Neil Young Archives Volume II: 1972–1976 (2020); Bob Dylan's 50th Anniversary Collection 1969 (2019) and others.  
 Long John Baldry's Looking At Long John Baldry: The UA Years 1964-1966 (2006), Live – Iowa State University (2009), and The Best of the Stony Plain Years (2014) were all released after he died in 2005.
 Two albums, Katorz (2006) and Infini (2009), by thrash metal band Voivod were released after the death of lead guitarist Denis D'Amour in 2005.
 Krzysztof Raczkowski is featured on Sweet Noise - The Triptic (2007, as member), Atrocious Filth - Atrocious Filth (2008), and Dies Irae - The Art Of An Endless Creation (2009, DVD).
 Chris Whitley albums Reiter In (2006), Dislocation Blues (2007) and On Air (2008) were released after he died from lung cancer in 2005.
 Shortly after Lou Rawls died three albums were released Live in Concert 1992–95, Merry Christmas, Baby and Christmas all released in 2006.  
 Lynden David Hall's single "Promise" was recorded in 2005 and released in 2013. Hall died of cancer in 2006.
 Rapper J Dilla died on February 10, 2006. He had three posthumous albums released: The Shining (August 2006), Jay Love Japan (2007), Jay Stay Paid (2009), and The Diary (2016).
 Nikki Sudden solo albums The Truth Doesn't Matter (2006) and Golden Vanity with Phil Shoenfelt (2009) were released. Many live albums have been released as well as stuff with Jaocbites and Swell Maps. Sudden died in March 2006.
 American V: A Hundred Highways (2006), American VI: Ain't No Grave (2010) and  Forever Words were released after Johnny Cash's death in 2003. Also, many live and collaboration albums have been released as well. 
 Maynard Ferguson's last album, The One and Only recorded a few weeks prior to his death in 2006, was released several months later in 2007.
 Korean singer U;Nee's last album, Habit, was released five days after her death in 2007.
 Gerald Levert's In My Songs was released in February 2007, three months after his death.
 Toše Proeski's album The Hardest Thing was released posthumously in 2009, two years after his death in a car accident.
 Grégory Lemarchal's La Voix d'un ange was released a month and a half after his death.
 LeRoi Moore, founding member of Dave Matthews Band, died of complications from an ATV accident while Big Whiskey and the Groogrux King was still in production. The album was released approximately nine months after his passing.
 Black Beauty, an unreleased album by the group Love, was recorded and shelved in 1973. The album was released in 2012, five years after the death of the band's frontman, Arthur Lee.
 Luther Vandross' single "Shine" was released in 2006, the year following his death.
 Brad Delp of Boston committed suicide in March 2007. He appears on Rockin Away with Barry Goudreau (2007), Mark Miller's Whatcha Gonna Do (2008) and Bruce Arnold's Orpheus Again (2010).
 Since Ike Turner's death in 2007 many albums have been released such as Jack Rabbit Blues: The Singles of 1958–1960 (2011) and other early work. 
 Dan Fogelberg's Love in Time (2009) was released nearly two years after his death. Also, Live at Carnegie Hall was released in 2017. 
 Jeff Healey's album Mess of Blues was released on March 11, 2008, nine days after his death from sarcoma. Also Songs from the Road (2009), Last Call (2010) and others were released. 
 Jimmy Carl Black released four studio and live albums in 2009. He appears on Frank Zappa and the Mothers of Invention's The Lumpy Money Project/Object (2009), Beat the Boots! III (2009), Road Tapes, Venue 1 (2012) and Meat Light (2016). Also, he appears on Ant-Bee's Electronic Church Muzik (2011). 
 Michael Jackson's song "This Is It" was released four months after his death in 2009.
 Michael Jackson's album Michael was released on December 14, 2010, 1 year and 5 months after his death in 2009.
 Michael Jackson's album Xscape was released on May 13, 2014, about 5 years after his death in 2009.
 Brother by Boyzone was released on March 8, 2010, five months after member Stephen Gately's death from natural causes on October 10, 2009.
 Neil Young's The Archives Vol. 1 1963–1972 was released in June 2009. It features Bruce Palmer, Danny Whitten, Jack Nitzsche, Kenny Buttrey and Rick James, all of whom died years before the boxset was released. 
 Al Martino's album Thank You was released in 2011, two years after his death. 
 SOULmate by Jacksoul was released on December 1, 2009, 10 days after Haydain Neale died of lung cancer.
 Jack Rose released three albums in 2010 after a sudden heart attack on December 5, 2009.
 Manic Street Preachers released an album, Journal for Plague Lovers using lyrics constructed by Richey Edwards before his disappearance in 1995.
 Nightmare, the fifth album by metal band Avenged Sevenfold, was released on July 27, 2010, almost seven months after the death of drummer The Rev on December 28, 2009.

2010s
 Gregory Slay, founder of Remy Zero died on New Year's Day 2010. Slay appears on Horsethief Beats' The Sound Will Find You (2010).
 In Love And War (aka ILAW, originally The Sickos Project) by Francis M. and Ely Buendia was released in May 2010, months after master rapper Francis Magalona died on March 6, 2009, from acute myeloid leukemia.
 Nujabes' album Spiritual State was released on December 3, 2011, a year after he died in a car accident on February 26, 2010. His compilation album Luv(Sic) Hexalogy was also released on December 9, 2015.
 Gil Scott-Heron's album Nothing New was released on April 19, 2014, almost three years after his death on May 27, 2011.
 Jay Reatard had many singles released after he died of a drug overdose in early 2010. He appears on In Utero, in Tribute, in Entirety (2014) tribute to Nirvana. 
 Mark Linkous is on Dark Night of the Soul with Danger Mouse. Released four months after Linkous committed suicide. 
 Ronnie James Dio live albums have been released since he died in 2010. Many like Heaven & Hell's Neon Nights: 30 Years of Heaven & Hell (2010), At Donington UK: Live 1983 & 1987 (2010), Finding the Sacred Heart - Live in Philly 1986 (2013), and Live in London, Hammersmith Apollo 1993 (2014) have all been released.
 Bee Gees' Mythology features Andy Gibb on "Arrow Through the Heart". The song was recorded in 1987 a year before Andy died.
 John Martyn's Heaven and Earth studio album was released in May 2011, two years after he died. Many compilation albums have been released since his death.
 Conrad Schnitzler's last album, Endtime recorded four days before his death in 2011, was released on April 8, 2012.
 Paul Gray bassist of Slipknot is featured on Antennas to Hell (2012) released two years after his death. 
 Ou Est le Swimming Pool released their first and only album Golden Year after lead singer Charles Haddon committed suicide two months before.
 Steve Lee of Gotthard is featured on Homegrown - Live in Lugano in 2011 a year after he died. 
 Eyedea's albums Birthday (I Feel Triangular) (2011) with Guitar Party, Grand's Sixth Sense (2011) with Sixth Sense, and The Many Faces of Mikey (2015) were all released after he died of a drug overdose in 2010.  
 Mick Karn of Dalis Car is featured on InGladAloneness. It was released in 2012 a year after Karn died of cancer. 
 Trish Keenan is featured on Scott Herren's The Only She Chapters (2011) and Broadcast's Berberian Sound Studio (2013). She suddenly died from Pneumonia on January 14, 2011.   
 Cold Chisel's Steve Prestwich is featured on No Plans (2012). Prestwich died of a brain tumor on January 16, 2011. 
 Nate Dogg is featured in singles "Party We Will Throw Now!" (2012), My House with Warren G (2015), Gangsta Walk (2016), and I Got Love (2018). Nate Dogg died in 2011.
 Wild Man Fischer's Deep State (2018) was released seven years after he died from heart failure.  
 Andrew Gold's The Late Show - Live 1978 was released in 2015, four years after he died. 
 Lioness: Hidden Treasures, an album of lost recordings (from 2002 to 2011) by British singer-songwriter Amy Winehouse, was released on December 5, 2011; four months after her death on July 23. Two singles were also released: "Our Day Will Come", on December 5; and "Body & Soul", which is a duet with the legendary Tony Bennett, on the day that would have been her 28th birthday.Dear Mr Fantasy: The Jim Capaldi Story (2011) was released after Jim Capaldi died in 2005. This was a four-disc boxed set.
 Argentinian singer Luis Alberto Spinetta released Los Amigo (recorded in 2011) on 27 November 2015 with a group project "Spinetta Los Amigo". He also released Ya No Mires Atrás (recorded between 2008 and 2009) on 23 January 2020. Spinetta died of lung cancer on February 8, 2012.
 Newark 1953 by Hank Mobley was released in 2012, 27 years after his death.
 Joey Ramone's ...Ya Know? was released in May 2012, 11 years after his death from lymphoma.
 Captain Beefheart's Bat Chain Puller was released on February 22, 2012. It was recorded in 1976. Also Sun Zoom Spark: 1970 to 1972 was released in 2014.  Beefheart died in 2010 from Multiple sclerosis. 
 Levon Helm's album The Midnight Ramble Sessions, Volume Three (2014) was released two years after he died. Also he appears on Neil Young's Neil Young Archives Volume II: 1972–1976 (2020). 
 Tommy Marth of The Killers is featured on Black Camaro's Black Camaricans in 2012. 
 Robin Gibb of Bee Gees released 50 St. Catherine's Drive in 2014 and Sing Slowly Sisters in 2015 after he died in 2012.
 Paco de Lucía's album Canción Andaluza was released on April 29, 2014, two months after his death.
 Christmas Party was released in 2018 after Davy Jones' death from a heart attack in 2012.
 Tony Sly of No Use for a Name appears on the band's Rarities Vol. 1: The Covers in 2017. Sly died in his sleep in 2012. 
 Mitch Lucker appears on Suicide Silence's You Can't Stop Me released nearly two years after Lucker's death from a motorcycle accident.
 Several of Ravi Shankar albums have been released since his death in 2012.
 La Misma Gran Señora by Jenni Rivera was released on December 11, 2012, two days after Rivera had died in a plane crash.
 From Beer to Eternity was the last album to have Ministry with Mike Scaccia. Scaccia died from a heart attack during the beginning of recording for the album. 
 Beautiful was released on January 15, 2013, approximately two years after Teena Marie's death in December 2010.
 Lost My Way by Tim Ryan was released on October 8, 2013, approximately two years following a fatal car crash.
 Eyehategod's drummer Joey LaCaze is on the band's album Eyehategod in 2014 a year after LaCaze died of respiratory failure. 
 Step Back by Johnny Winter was released on September 2, 2014, almost two months after his death.
 M2: Descending into Madness by Midnight was released in 2014 five years after Midnight died of a stomach aneurysm.
 Isaiah "Ikey" Owens is on Run The Jewels' Run the Jewels 2 on October 24, 2014, and Omar Rodríguez-López's Arañas en la Sombra released in 2016. Owens died of a sudden heart attack on October 14, 2014, in Mexico.
 Pink Floyd's 2014 album The Endless River was released six years after keyboardist Richard Wright's death; the album consists almost entirely of leftover instrumentals featuring Wright from the recording sessions for 1994's The Division Bell.
 "Let Me in Your Heart Again" and "There Must Be More to Life Than This" (with Michael Jackson) were released after the death of Queen frontman, Freddie Mercury's death in 1991, and Michael Jackson's death in 2009. They were both released for the album Queen Forever.
 Johnny Ramone is featured on Morrissey Curates The Ramones (2014). Johnny died in 2004.
 Mike Porcaro bassist for Toto is featured on Toto's 40 Trips Around the Sun (2018) and Old Is New (2018). The album features songs that have were previously unreleased.
 Argentinian rock band Krebs' only album Krebs was released on March 13, 2015, after Agustín Briolini was electrocuted to death in 2014.It's All Over Now Baby Blue recorded by the SIMS Foundation was a tribute album to Sims Ellison of Pariah, celebrating 20 years after his death. Ellison committed suicide in 1995 and is the first album after his death.
 Blind Melon's Screamin' at the Sun was released on iTunes in 2015, 20 years after Shannon Hoon's death. The live album was recorded in New York in 1993. 
 The Velvet Underground's The Complete Matrix Tapes released in 2015 as a live album recorded in 1969. It has Lou Reed who died in 2015 and Sterling Morrison who died in 1995. 
 Chinx Drugz's album Welcome to JFK was released in August 2015, one month after his death.
 Curtis Knight's You Can't Use My Name: The RSVP/PPX Sessions (2015) featuring Jimi Hendrix was released after Knight died in 1999 and Hendrix died in 1970. This was recorded when Hendrix was backing up for Knight in 1965 to 1967 before Hendrix's fame.
 Dusty Springfield's Faithful was released in 2015. It was recorded in 1971.
 Frank Zappa's Project/Object Series features Meat Light (2016) was released 23 years after Zappa's death. This album is a 3 CD compilation featuring members of The Mothers of Invention; Ray Collins, Jimmy Carl Black, Billy Mundi and Jim "Motorhead" Sherwood. 
 Tony Duran appears on Frank Zappa's Little Dots (2016) was in Zappa's band in 1972. This album was recorded in Fall of 1972 during the 1972 Petit Wazoo tour. Duran died from prostate cancer in 2011. 
 Pantelis Pantelidis' single "Thimame" was released in June 2016, four months after his death in a car crash.
 Live Facelift by Alice In Chains was recorded in 1990, and released on vinyl in 2016. Also Live In Oakland October 8th 1992 was released on July 24, 2017, on vinyl Unofficial Release, 180 Gram. Featured both Layne Staley who died in 2002 and Mike Starr who died in 2011. Only 5000 copies were issued.
 A Tribe Called Quest's We Got It from Here... Thank You 4 Your Service was released on November 11, 2016, eight months after Phife Dawg died form diabetes. The album features guests Elton John, Jack White, Kanye West, Andre 3000, Kendrick Lamar, Anderson .Paak, Talib Kweli, Consequence and Busta Rhymes.  
 Michael Burks' I'm a Bluesman was released in 2016, after he died of a sudden heart attack in 2012. 
 You and I, a compilation of early studio recordings in 1993 by Jeff Buckley, was released 19 years after his death.
 Just two days short of the one year anniversary of David Bowie's 2016 death from liver cancer, the EP No Plan was released, featuring three studio recordings of Bowie performing songs from his musical Lazarus, which had previously only been recorded by the musical's cast. The songs on No Plan are stated to be the last three songs Bowie had ever recorded in his lifetime.
 Prince's 4ever album was released seven months after his death of a fentanyl overdose. The album features the unreleased track "Moonbeam Levels" which was recorded in 1982. Also Piano and a Microphone 1983 (2018)  and Originals (2019) were released.
 Christina Grimmie's EP, Side B, was released ten months after her death. On the day before the first anniversary of her death, her album All Is Vanity was released.
 Leon Russell's final album, On a Distant Shore was released on September 22, 2017. He nearly a year earlier from heart surgery. 
 Greg Lake's live album, Live in Piacenza was released in 2017. He died on December 7, 2016. Also he produced Annie Barbazza & Max Repetti - Moonchild (2018).
 Tangerine Dream's mini-album Quantum Key, EP Probe 6-8 and albums Quantum Gate and Raum were released after Edgar Froese's death in 2015.
 Gord Downie's solo album Introduce Yerself was released on October 27, 2017; ten days after his death from brain cancer.
 Viola Beach's eponymous album was released in July 2016, five months after all the band members (and their manager) died when their car fell off a bridge.
 Poet  Artist, Jonghyun's second solo album, was released in January 2018, a month after his death.
 Here's to You, the ninth studio album by country music duo Montgomery Gentry, was released following member Troy Gentry's death in a helicopter crash. The accident took place on September 8, 2017, in Medford, New Jersey, where the duo was scheduled to perform that evening.
 Johnny Cash's Forever Words (2018) features Chris Cornell, former lead singer of Soundgarden and Audioslave on "You Never Knew My Mind". Cash died in 2003 and Cornell died by suicide on May 18, 2017.
 "Falling Down", a collaboration between rappers XXXTentacion and Lil Peep was released on September 19, 2018. It is Lil Peep's third posthumous single as a lead artist (ten months after his death) and XXX's first (three months after he was murdered).
 "Cry Alone" a single was released posthumously by Lil Peep on October 18, 2018. It is Lil Peep's fourth posthumous single as a lead artist.
 Gregg Allman's final album, Southern Blood, was released on September 8, 2017. He died of liver cancer on 27 May 2017.
 Butch Trucks of The Allman Brothers Band is featured on Allman's The Fox Box (2017), Filmore West 1971 (2019) and Trouble No More: 50th Anniversary Collection (2020). He died in January 2017.
 George Michael's song "This Is How (We Want You to Get High)" was recorded in 2015 and was released in Last Christmas soundtrack album on 8 November 2019.
 10x10 by Ronnie Montrose was released on September 29, 2017. Montrose died in March 2012. 
 Chester Bennington of Linkin Park is on the band's album One More Light Live released on December 15, 2017, just five months after Bennington's suicide. It was a European tour for the album One More Light just weeks before he died.
 Bennington featured on the song "Cross Off" by Mark Morton, from the album Anesthetic, which was released in 2019.
 Bennington's former band, Grey Daze, released their album Amends on June 26, 2020, nearly three years after his suicide.
 The 20th anniversary edition of Linkin Park's album '''Hybrid Theory was released on October 9, 2020, with many unreleased songs and demos from 1996 to 2002.
 XXXTentacion was murdered on June 18, 2018. He had two posthumous studio albums released: Skins (December 2018), and Bad Vibes Forever (December 2019).
 The song "Where is Love" by Mel and Kim was released in 2018. Mel Appleby died in 1990 from pneumonia while battling cancer. 
 Johnny Hallyday's posthumous album Mon pays c'est l'amour was released on October 19, 2018. He died of cancer on 5 December 2017.
 Chris Cornell's self-titled album was released on November 16, 2018, a year and half after his death.
 The Cranberries' final album, In the End, was released in 2019, one year after the death of lead singer Dolores O'Riordan.
 Kyle Pavone of We Came as Romans did a collaboration song with Kayzo and ARMNHMR, LA Never Says Goodbye released in 2019. Pavone died form an accidental drug overdose on August 25, 2018. 
 Lil Peep' song titled "Star Shopping" was released in April 2019, over a year after his death.
 Avicii's song "SOS" was released on April 10, 2019, almost a year after his death. His posthumous album TIM was released on June 6, 2019.
 J. J. Cale's album Stay Around was released on April 26, 2019, nearly six years after his death. Also, he is featured on Eric Clapton's Live in San Diego released in 2016 which was recorded in 2007. 
 Cassius' final album, Dreems was released on June 21, 2019, 2 days after Philippe Zdar died after falling from a 19-storey building in Paris.
 Scary Kids Scaring Kids released their single Loved Forever on September 29, 2019, honoring former lead singer Tyson Stevens who died of a suspected heroin overdose in 2014. Stevens would have been 34 years old on his birthday September 29. 
 Freddie Mercury's Never Boring was released on October 11, 2019, nearly 28 years after his death. 
 Yes live album Like It Is: Yes at the Mesa Arts Center and mini-album From a Page were released after Chris Squire died from leukemia in 2015.
 Leonard Cohen's posthumous album Thanks for the Dance was released on November 22, 2019, three years after his death.
 Argentinian singer Gustavo Cerati's live album En Vivo en Monterrey was released on November 20, 2019, five years after his death. The music video for his song "No te creo", which was filmed in 2004, was released on YouTube on August 10, 2021.
 Buddy Miles the drummer for Jimi Hendrix appears on Songs for Groovy Children: The Fillmore East Concerts released on November 22, 2019, nearly 50 years after the concert on New years 1969–1970. Hendrix died in 1970 and Miles died in 2008.
 XXXTentacion‘s final album Bad Vibes Forever was released on December 6, 2019.

2020s
 Mac Miller's album Circles was released on January 17, 2020, about a year after his death.
 Cadet's first studio album The Rated Legend was released on April 10, 2020. He died on February 9, 2019, in a car accident. 
 Eddie Money's album Brand New Day was released on April 21, 2020, seven months after his death. It was originally set to be released on July 19, 2019, but was subsequently postponed due to Money's illness.
 Neil Peart appears on the 40th anniversary version of Rush's album Permanent Waves, released on May 29, 2020. The 40th anniversary edition features unreleased live content from concerts in England. Peart died four months before its release. 
 Guru Josh's song  "Love to Infinity" with Anike Ekina and Darren Bailie was released on May 29, 2020. Guru died in 2015 when he committed suicide. 
 Pop Smoke's album Shoot for the Stars, Aim for the Moon was released on July 3, 2020, five months after his death.
 Juice Wrld's album Legends Never Die was released on July 10, 2020, seven months after his death.
 Wayne Static of Static-X is on a 2-part album series Project Regeneration Vol. 1 and Vol.2. Volume 1 was released on July 10, 2020. Volume 2 is to be released in the near future. Static died in 2014 from an accidental drug and alcohol overdose. 
 Jerry Garcia and John Kahn's Garcia Live Volume 14 was released on July 24, 2020. The album was recorded live in 1986. Garcia died in 1995 and Kahn died in 1996. 
 Haruma Miura's second single, "Night Diver", was released posthumously on August 26, 2020, one month and eight days after his death.
 Philip Chevron of The Pogues is on BBC Sessions 1984-1985, released on August 29, 2020. Chevron died in 2013.
 Spanish singer Camilo Sesto's song "Te Quiero Así" was released on September 7, 2020, 1 year after he died from kidney failure. It was recorded during Amaneciendo sessions.
 Ken Hensley appears on Blind Golem's song "The Day Is Gone" from the album A Dream Of Fantasy released in 2021. Hensley died on November 4, 2020. 
 Neil Young's Neil Young Archives Volume II: 1972–1976 features band members Tim Drummond, Jack Nitzsche, Kenny Buttrey, Stan Szelest, Rusty Kershaw, Joe Lala, Rick Danko and Levon Helm.
 Florian Schneider appears on Kraftwerk's song "Non Stop" from the album Remixes released on December 21, 2020, eight months after his death.
 Alexi Laiho appears on Bodom After Midnight's Paint the Sky with Blood, released in 2021. Laiho died on December 29, 2020.
 Chick Corea appears on Eliane Elias's Mirror Mirror, released on September 10, 2021. Corea died on February 9, 2021, from cancer. 
 DMX's album Exodus was released on May 28, 2021. Also the single "X Moves" was released six days after DMX's death, the song did not appear on Exodus. DMX died on April 2, 2021, from a sudden heart attack.  
 Phi Nhung's single "Hai Ơi, Đừng Qua Sông" was released on October 8, 2021, ten days after her death from COVID-19.
 Charlie Watts appears the reissue of The Rolling Stones's Tattoo You released on October 22, 2021, two months after his death.  
 Juice Wrld's album Fighting Demons was released on December 10, 2021, two years and two days after his death in 2019.
 King Von's album What It Means to Be King was released on March 4, 2022, 1 year, 3 months, and 26 days after his death in 2020.
 Phife Dawg's album Forever was released on March 22, 2022, in the 6th anniversary of his death due to diabetes complications.
 Taylor Hawkins appears on Ozzy Osbourne's Patient Number 9 released on September 9, 2022, and Iggy Pop's Every Loser released on January 6, 2023. Hawkins died on March 25, 2022. 
 Klaus Schulze's final album Deus Arrakis was released on July 1, 2022, 2 months, and 4 days after his death.
 Aaron Carter's final album Blacklisted was released on November 7, 2022, two days after his death.

References

Music
Posthumous